Singled Out is an American dating game show created by Burt Wheeler & Sharon Sussman which originally ran on MTV from 1995 to 1998. Each episode featured a group of 50 singles competing for a date with one main contestant.

The original hosts were Chris Hardwick and Jenny McCarthy. When McCarthy left the show in early 1997 to star in her own sitcom, Jenny, MTV hired Carmen Electra to replace her for the last season and a half.

The show became a cult classic, putting a more comedic spin on traditional and formal dating shows. Contestants would most likely be unconventional and cast purely for entertainment, without any assumed compatibility put into effect.

MTV revamped the series in late 2018 for its YouTube channel. The overhauled format gave a more urban contemporary hip hop theme to the show. Incorporating a main social media aspect as well, the show features rapper Justina Valentine acting as host, with rapper Conceited as a cohost.

On June 4, 2019, it was announced that a reboot of the series would premiere on April 6, 2020 on Quibi with Keke Palmer as the host.

Format (1995–1998)
Each game began with one main contestant, the "Picker", being escorted onto the set blindfolded in front of the 50 potential dates in the "Dating Pool" while the announcer described him/her. The Picker was then led to a seat facing away from the Dating Pool and further divided from the potential dates by a wall.

Round 1
The Picker was presented with a board showing six categories, which ranged from physical attributes to preferences in love-making to leisure activities. They generally were expressed in a humorous style, often with various pop-culture references. After choosing a category, two or three choices were listed (for example, a category on hair might be divided into blonde, brunette, and redhead), and the Picker was asked to eliminate one of the choices. After eliminating a choice, all the contestants who fit that choice left the Dating Pool, in view of the Picker. This process was repeated until five to eight potentials were left, at which point they advanced to the next round.

In the third season, a Golden Ticket was introduced, which allowed the Picker to save one eliminated player as he or she walked in front of him on the way out of the studio. This contestant automatically advanced to the semifinals. For episodes taped outside, the "Golden Ticket" was replaced with a Golden Lifesaver, with the same rules.

Round 2
At that point, the Picker asked a series of questions which ranged from Dating Game–style questions (example, "if you had me alone in a limousine for three hours, what would you do to me?") to stunt-oriented questions (example, hitting a paddle ball a number of times, with the female host relaying the potential date's performance to the Picker). If the Picker was satisfied with the answer or performance, he or she would "keep" the contestant, advancing them to the final round. If the Picker was not satisfied, he or she would "dump" the contestant, eliminating him or her from further play. "Dumped" contestants were not shown to the Picker as in the first round, but were instead marked with some sort of prop, such as a toilet seat around the neck, a bag with a sad face on it on the male player's head, or a pageant sash labeled "Dumped". This round continued either until three contestants were "kept," or all but three had been "dumped." If the potential date received the golden ticket, then sometimes the host would show him or her to the picker.

Round 3
The wall was removed from behind the Picker to reveal a walkway with several spaces behind him or her. The three finalists started on the back step, and were asked a series of two-choice questions. Each time a contestant's answer matched the Picker's, the player advanced one space on the walkway (occasionally, a question might be worth two steps). The first player to make it to the circle on which the Picker was sitting won a date with the Picker. In case of a tie, a final question was asked to the tying contestants, such as "How many girls did (Picker's name) say he dated last year?". The contestant who guessed the closest without going over won the date.

The Reveal
After a couple had been made, the two contestants were placed back-to-back while Hardwick read a description of the winning player to the Picker. The contestants were then turned around to meet each other for the first time, and their trip and prizes were described to them by the announcer.

Two games were played per show, first with a woman picking from 50 single men, then with a man picking from 50 single women.

Characters
Besides the hosts, the show also had mascot characters. The most prominent character was a scruffy, cigar-smoking cupid known as "Bob the Angel" (who mainly appears in the opening credits with a crown on its head), would sometimes appear in a series of vignettes with Hardwick and McCarthy. Bob would be joined by a wife, Roberta, and a son, Little Bob. Other characters included Fidel Castro, or an evangelist. These characters would often interact with the contestants during the "Keep 'Em or Dump 'Em" round, such as one male contestant being challenged to a game of tetherball against Castro. On rare occasions celebrities would appear. A female Picker claimed she was a Mel Torme fan and challenged a contestant to sing like him, only to have the real Torme come and judge his work. The character did appear in the opening credits of the YouTube version but in the Quibi version he did not appear at all as it was replaced by a small heart in the "O" title card with a white arrow being shot in it as it changes its background to pink.

Format (2018–)
The format in the 2018 revival is significantly different. The show has a main hip hop/urban contemporary theme, with a social media or Tinder motif as well. Also showcasing a more inclusive tolerance towards alternative lifestyles featuring LGBTQ segments as well.

Likewise in the original version, "The Picker", is seated facing away from the audience. 50 other "singles" still compete for one person, however only 25 are genuine legitimate contestants in studio. Referred to as "IRL" contestants. (Keeping up the social media theme). The other 25 are "URL" contestants. (Which the show makes it seems they are competing via the internet, however all URL contestants are actually backstage. A still selfie of them are shown as avatars on a giant plasma screen, that the picker cannot see, situated next to the studio contestants.) They are essentially contestants as well, however not quite. The catch is, there is a possibility some (or possibly all), the URL contestants are illegitimate contestants, or to keep up with the show's theme, a Catfish. If a "URL" contestant is real, the selfie image on the screen is actually them and they are backstage. If a "URL" contestant is fake, their selfie is a stock image of an actor, and the "URL" contestant (who will be eventually revealed later) is essentially a catfish that during the reveal looks nothing like the image of them (which is usually embellished as person more conventionally attractive as them on the screen. Sometimes even a different gender. However, catfish or otherwise, anything a "URL" does on the show is their own validity, and they are still a legitimate contestant).

Round 1
The Picker was presented with a large board of six categories. Which narrowed down a contestants (whether IRL or URL) attributes. Anything from physical attraction, mental attraction, hobbies and social media habits. (Categories would have a humorous tone to them.) Once choosing a category two or three choices were listed (for example, a category on personality would be listed as "Cray or Cray" or "Chill"), and The Picker was asked to eliminate any contestant who falls under that trope. "IRL" contestants who were eliminated left the studio in view of the picker revealing themselves. (URL contestants are also eliminated likewise, however The Picker has no idea of this.) This continued until at least eight or less "IRL" contestants remained (which if less than eight "IRL" contestants were left, they would automatically advance to the next round) and/or eight or less "URL" contestants remained (which if less than eight "URL" were left on the screen, they would automatically advance to the next round.) who would then advance to Round 2.

Round 2
The Picker who still has no idea who the "IRL" and URL" contestants are, names are revealed and formally introduced and interviewed. (The "URL" contestants are still only represented by their selfie avatar, and a dating site like profile is instead shown.). At this time, The Picker is only allowed to choose one "IRL" and one "URL" contestant to move onto the following round. This is done by an activity or challenge The Picker asks the "IRL" contestants to do, and by various creative means for the "URL" contestants to do. (For example, The Picker may ask the "URL" contestants to post an emoji they think is cute etc. "URL" contestants although are still only represented by their selfie image, can still interact by text messages and also sending a voice message. However, the chance of them being a catfish is still possible.) The eliminated "IRL" contestants walk out the studio and are revealed to The Picker. (The "URL" contestants are also eliminated with The Picker having no idea who they are.) Once one "IRL" and one "URL" contestant is left, they move onto the final round.

Round 3
The Picker is now allowed to see the "IRL" contestant that is left, and they also see the selfie avatar image of the "URL" contestant on the plasma screen. To make the choice somewhat easier, an activity (which the winner/person who got the most matches isn't necessarily the one chosen by The Picker) done to get to know more about the "IRL" and "URL" contestants is played. Before the show, The Picker was given a survey on personality questions. (For example, "kiss on first date or no?"). These same questions are asked, and the "IRL" contestant would give their choice, (The "URL" contestant would send a text message of their answer). The Picker would raise a cue card of the choice they made earlier. If it was a match, the "IRL" and/or the "URL" contestant would get a point. After the questions are asked, The Picker then would have to make a choice. Either pick the "IRL" contestant in the studio, or go with the "URL" contestant (in which The Picker only knows them from their selfie avatar, with the possibility of them being a catfish.) The Picker would then make the choice, leading onto the reveal.

The Reveal
Immediately after The Picker makes their choice, if they chose the "IRL" contestant, they would simply be matched together. However, if The Picker chose the "URL" contestant, they would then reveal themselves (in which they were backstage the entire time catfish or otherwise). If the "URL" contestant was not a catfish, they would be matched together as if they chose the "IRL" contestant. If the "URL" contestant is a catfish, The Picker usually is unhappy about this, however they can still decide to accept the catfish regardless.

Merchandise

Books
The show served as the basis for a book: MTV's Singled Out Guide to Dating (MTV Books, 1996) by Lynn Harris and J.D. Heiman. This tie-in advice book was actually two books in one, a "His" side (with Chris Hardwick on the cover) and, turned over, a "Hers" side (with Jenny McCarthy on the cover). In this book, winning couples were interviewed about their dates.

VHS Tapes
In 1996, a VHS tapes called Singled Out: The Dirt on the Dates! follows contestants  selected from a crowd of fifty eligible young hopefuls as they go on their first date. Taking you behind-the-scenes for an in-depth look at where the trail of romance leads.

Appearances in other media
The show was parodied on a April 23, 1996 episode of The Dana Carvey Show as part of a segment called Entertainment Headline (parody of Entertainment Tonight) hosted by Heather Morgan & Steve Carell respectively where it leads into a story about how the FBI actually were clued into the Unabomber's whereabouts because he made an appearance on Singled Out. In the clip, Chris Hardwick (Stephen Colbert) and Jenny McCarthy (also played by Heather Morgan) aid Ted Kaczynski/The Unabomber (Dana Carvey) in playing the game where he picks attributes on a board in order to narrow down the playing field. On the second topic, Hardwick mentions  "e-mails" which causes Kaczynski to get wide-eyed and starts babbling about his manifesto. The rest of the girls leave on their account.
The show was parodied on an October 5, 1996 episode of Saturday Night Live with host Lisa Kudrow where Mary Katherine Gallagher (Molly Shannon) appears as a contestant on the show.
A November 1, 1996 episode of Boy Meets World featured Eric Matthews appearing on Singled Out chosen because of his hair. He ended up with a date with a sophomore from Columbia University however, it was later revealed that both Eric and his date lied about being college students to get on the show (only university students were eligible to be contestants, with some exceptions, such as military personnel of the same age). This episode featured Chris Hardwick playing as himself.
The show was parodied as "Single Louts" in a 1996 issue of the satire magazine MAD hosted by Diss Hardup (Chris Hardwick) and Jammy McAirhead (Jenny McCarthy).
The show was parodied as "Solo-ed Out" in a 1997 issue of the comic "Sabrina: the Teenage Witch" where Marc Antony, after breaking up with Cleopatra, is sent forward to the 20th century by Sabrina and finds himself as the Picker on the show. Sabrina brings Cleopatra on as a contestant and must help convince Marc that they should reunite. Additionally, Jenny McCarthy is parodied as Minnie Garthney.
In a scene in the 1997 film Romy and Michele's High School Reunion, Romy (played by Mira Sorvino) unsuccessfully tries out for the show as the cut off age is 25, and is told to "try VH1."

International versions

References

External links
 
 Singled Out – UKGameshows
 A Singled Out insider on packages, muscles, and the show's biggest secret
 TV guide pick of Shirly Brener and Nati Ravitz on an Israeli cover of TV Guide

1990s American game shows
1990s American reality television series
1995 American television series debuts
1998 American television series endings
2010s American game shows
2010s American reality television series
2020s American reality television series
2020s American game shows
2018 American television series debuts
American dating and relationship reality television series
MTV game shows
MTV weekday shows
Quibi original programming
American television series revived after cancellation
1990s British game shows
2000s British game shows